Roland Raymond Ferdinand Caillaud (January 5, 1905 – December 3, 1977) – known professionally as Roland Caillaux, and sometimes using the pseudonym Roland Caipland – was a French actor and artist. He is known for acting in several French films in the 1920s and 1930s, and for producing and publishing homoerotic illustrations in the mid 20th century.

Art 
Caillaux has long been best known for illustrating 20 lithographies pour un livre que j'ai lu (20 lithographs for a book I read), which accompanied a text attributed to Jean Genet with images of male homosexuality, including explicit sexual activity. The book was published in April 1945, without the name of the author, the publisher or place of publication, with a print run of only 115 copies.

In this text there are excerpts, however variants, of Notre-Dame-des-Fleurs and The Parade, poems published by Marc Barbezat in 1948 in a collection entitled Poems and signed this once Jean Genet (Editions L'Arbalète).

Roland Caillaud's studio was located on Rue Boulard in the 14th arrondissement of Paris; it is there, between 1944 and 1945, that Jean Genet met the painter through model Édouard Dermit.

Nicole Canet, who has rediscovered many of Caillaud's drawings, reports that he inherited  money from his parents and lived as an annuitant after having been an actor. He lived at 5 rue de l'Ancienne Comédie. In a memoir, François Sentein says that when he traveled by bicycle to Montpensier street where Jean Cocteau lived, he kept his bicycle pump in his hand, for fear of it being stolen.

Acting 
Under the name Roland Caillaux, he appeared in the following films:
 1924 : La Galerie des monstres by Jaque Catelain
 1928 : Tire-au-flanc by Jean Renoir : the sergeant
 1929 : Figaro by Tony Lekain and Gaston Ravel : Grippe-Soleil
 1929 : Le Ruisseau by René Hervil
 1930 : Soyons gais by Arthur Robison : Bruce
 1930 : Le masque d'Hollywood by Clarence G. Badger and John Daumery : Bing
 1932 : Baroud by Rex Ingram and Alice Terry : André Duval, a sergeant of Spahis
 1932 :  by Georges Lacombe
 1934 : Itto by Jean Benoît-Lévy and Marie Epstein : Lieutenant Jean Dumontier
He performed in the following stage plays:

 1929: La rouille by Vladimir Kirchon and Andreï Ouspenski, Théâtre de l'Avenue
 1930 : Juliette ou La clé des songes by Georges Neveux, Théâtre de l'Avenue
 1930 : La Passion  by Edmond Haraucourt, Comédie-Française

Paintings, drawings, illustrations  
 Raymond Voinquel en costume de marin, 30 x 23 cm, 1931
 Portrait de Christian Bérard dans l'atelier, 22 x 18 cm, 1937
 Gentilhomme de la Renaissance, aquarelle, 64 x 48 cm, 1937
 Jeune Femme à l’orientale, 72 x 50 cm, 1938
 Femme du désert, huile, 114 x 87 cm, 1939
 Village en bord de mer, huile, 54 x 81 cm, 1943
 Portrait d’adolescent, mine de plomb, 46 x 31 cm, 1944
 [frontispice] Mademoiselle de Murville de Roger Peyrefitte, éditions Jean Vigneau, 1947
 Le Pot ancien, huile, 81 x 65 cm, s.d.
 Verlaine et Rimbaud, fusain, 31 x 24 cm, s.d.
Some drawings seem to have been signed by the pseudonym Roland Caipland

Exposure(s)
 1933, Paris, Galerie des Quatre-Chemins

References

External links 

 
 20 lithographies pour un livre que j'ai lu, read online
 His relationship with Jean Genet 
 His photographic portrait by Dora Maar
 Biography and paintings by Roland Caillaux - Galerie Au Bonheur du Jour

1905 births
1977 deaths
French male film actors
French male silent film actors
20th-century French male actors
Artists from Paris
French erotic artists
Pseudonymous artists
French gay artists
French gay actors
20th-century French LGBT people